Balady or Baladi (بلدي) is an Arabic word meaning "native" or "local." It may refer to:

 Eish Baladi or Aish Balady, rustic Egyptian flatbread similar to pita
 Baladi cheese, a Middle Eastern feta
 Balady citron, a variety of citron in Israel and Palestine
 Baladi music, a form of urban Egyptian dance music
 Baladi, a group of Yemenite Jews
 Beledi, also called "baladi", a duple meter used in Arabic music; and also rustic or folk tradition music

See also
 Bilady (disambiguation)